The Al-Fateh Mosque (also known as Al-Fateh Islamic Center & Al Fateh Grand Mosque) (transliterated: Masjid al-Fatih) was one of the largest mosques in the world, encompassing 6,500 square meters and having the capacity to accommodate over 7,000 worshippers at a time.  The mosque was built by the late Sheikh Isa bin Salman Al Khalifa in 1987 and was named after Ahmed Al Fateh. In 2006, Al-Fateh became the site of the National Library of Bahrain.

About 
The mosque was the largest place of worship in Bahrain. It is located next to the Al Fateh Highway in Juffair, which is a suburban neighborhood of Manama. The huge dome built on top of the Al-Fateh Mosque was constructed entirely of fibreglass. Weighing over 60 Tons, the dome was the world's largest fiberglass dome. The marble used in the floors is Italian and the chandelier was from Austria. The doors were made of teak wood from India. Throughout the mosque is Kufic calligraphy.

Library
The library of Ahmed Al-Fateh Islamic Center has around 7,000 books, some as old as 100 years or more. These include copies of the books of the teachings of Prophet Muhammad or what is referred to as the books of Hadith, the Global Arabic Encyclopedia, the Encyclopedia of Islamic Jurisprudence, Al-Azhar journals which have been printed more than a hundred years ago, as well as numerous periodicals and magazines.

Tourism 
Besides being a place of worship, the mosque is one of the premier tourist attractions in Bahrain. It is open from 9am to 4pm and tours are conducted in a variety of languages including English, French, Filipino, Russian and many other languages, special arrangements are encouraged for smooth sailing. The mosque is open to visitors and tourists on all Fridays.

Gallery

See also 
 List of Mosques in Bahrain

References

External links

Al Fateh Islamic Center Official Website

Mosques in Manama
Sunni mosques
Mosque buildings with domes
Buildings and structures in Manama
Tourist attractions in Manama
Al Fateh